Hesperolemur is a genus of adapiform primate that lived in the middle Eocene (49-37 million years ago) of southern California. It is an immigrant taxa which appears to be most closely related to the earlier European forms of Cantius. There are no later taxa that appear to have derived from Hesperolemur.

The weak but present development of mesostyles and pseudohypocone link Hesperolemur to Cantius. Morphologically, Hesperolemur is distinct from other notharctine taxa in having a partially fused ectotympanic anulus in the auditory bulla, no stapedial artery, and no lower molar paraconids. As the specimen used to make these analyses was badly damaged, others have argued against the existence of such differences and move Hesperolemur to a species of Cantius, Cantius actius.

References

Literature cited

 

Fleagle, J. G. 1999. Primate Adaptation and Evolution. San Diego, Academic Press.
Mikko's Phylogeny Archive
Gebo, DL. 2002. Adapiformes: phylogeny and adaptation. The Primate Fossil Record. Cambridge University Press
Godinot, M. A Summary of Adapiform Systematics and Phylogeny. Folia Primatologica, 1998
Gunnel, GF. New notharctine (primates, adapiformes) skull from the Uintan (middle Eocene) of San Diego County, California. American Journal of Physical Anthropology, 98:4. 1995.
Rose, KD et al. Skull of Early Eocene Cantius abditus (Primates:Adapiformes) and its phylogenetic implications, with a reevaluation of "Hesperolemur" actius. Am J Phys Anthropol. 1999 Aug;109(4):523-39.

Prehistoric strepsirrhines
Eocene primates
Prehistoric primate genera
Fossil taxa described in 1995
Eocene mammals of North America